|- style="background-color: #A0B0FF;" colspan="3"
|  Planet
|- bgcolor="#FFFAFA" 
|  HD 222582 b || Data Simbad
|- bgcolor="#FFFAFA" 
|   || Data ExoPlanet

HD 222582 is a multiple star system in the equatorial constellation of Aquarius. It is invisible to the naked eye with an apparent visual magnitude of 7.7, but can be viewed with binoculars or a small telescope. The system is located at a distance of 138 light years from the Sun based on parallax, and it is drifting further away with a radial velocity of +12 km/s. It is located close enough to the ecliptic that it is subject to lunar occultations.

The primary member of this system, designated component A, is an ordinary G-type main-sequence star with a stellar classification of G5V. The physical properties of the star are similar enough to the Sun that it is considered a candidate solar twin. It is about 6.5 billion years old with an inactive chromosphere and is spinning with a low projected rotational velocity of 1.7 km/s. The mass and metallicity of this star are essentially the same as the Sun. It has a 14% larger radius and is radiating 1.3 times the luminosity of the Sun from its photosphere at an effective temperature of 5,790 K.

Component B of this system is a close binary system with the components designated HD 222582 Ba and Bb. The pair have a combined class of M4.5 V+ and about 20% the mass of the Sun.

Planetary system
In November 1999, a dense superjovian planet was announced orbiting the primary by the California and Carnegie Planet Search. Designated component 'b', it was discovered using the radial velocity method, using 24 observations over a period of 1.5 years.

See also
 HD 224693
 List of extrasolar planets

References

External links
 

G-type main-sequence stars
M-type main-sequence stars
Solar twins
Planetary systems with one confirmed planet
Triple stars

Aquarius (constellation)
BD-06 6262
222582
116906
J23415154-0559086